7 Andromedae (abbreviated 7 And) is a single, yellow-white hued star in the northern constellation of Andromeda. 7 Andromedae is the Flamsteed designation. The star is moving further from the Sun with a heliocentric radial velocity of 12 km/s.

This is an ordinary F-type main-sequence star with a stellar classification of F1V, which indicates it is generating energy from hydrogen fusion at its core. This energy is being radiated from its photosphere at the rate of 7.8 times the Sun's luminosity with an effective temperature of 7,380 K. 7 Andromedae is 1.1 billion years old and is spinning with a projected rotational velocity of 61 km/s.

Within Andromeda it is at the middle of a northerly chain asterism – 8, 11 are further south-westward, with 5, then 3 Andromedae in the other direction.  This star is the closest of these five, all of quite great apparent magnitude.

References

F-type main-sequence stars
Andromeda (constellation)
Durchmusterung objects
Andromedae, 07
219080
114570
8830